Cerebellar peduncles connect the cerebellum to the brain stem. There are six cerebellar peduncles in total, three on each side:

 Superior cerebellar peduncle is a paired structure of white matter that connects the cerebellum to the mid-brain.
 Middle cerebellar peduncles connect the cerebellum to the pons and are composed entirely of centripetal fibers.
 Inferior cerebellar peduncle is a thick rope-like strand that occupies the upper part of the posterior district of the medulla oblongata.

The peduncles form the lateral border of the fourth ventricle, and form a distinctive diamond the middle peduncle forming the central corners of the diamond, while the superior and inferior peduncles form the superior and inferior edges, respectively.

Structural origin
The superior cerebellar peduncles (brachia conjunctiva) emerge from the cerebellum and ascend to form the lateral portion of the roof of the fourth ventricle, where they enter the brainstem below the inferior colliculi. They are bridged by the superior medullary velum. The superior cerebellar peduncles represent the main output route from the cerebellum, and as such, most of their fibers are efferent. A relatively small afferent contribution is present. The efferent pathways include the cerebellorubral, dentatothalamic, and fastigioreticular tracts. All of them emerge from cerebellar nuclei; the cerebellorubral fibers from the globose and emboliform nuclei, the dentatothalamic fibers from the dentate nucleus, and the fastigioreticular fibers from the fastigial nucleus. They emerge together from the various nuclei to ascend in the roof of the fourth ventricle and proceed anteriorly to the midbrain tegmental area medial to the lateral lemniscus. The cerebellorubral fibers cross over at this point to enter the contralateral red nucleus. The dentatothalamic fibers also cross over and ascend to synapse in the ventral intermediate (VI) and ventral anterior (VA) nuclei of the thalamus. The fastigioreticular fibers enter the reticular formation of the midbrain, pons, and medulla oblongata.
Afferent pathways include the anterior spinocerebellar and tectocerebellar tracts. The fibers of the anterior spinocerebellar tract originate in Clarke's column of the spinal cord and cross in the anterior white commissure to the lateral funiculus, where they ascend to upper pontine levels before crossing back to enter the cerebellum through the superior peduncle. They terminate in the hind limb region of the cerebellar cortex. The tectocerebellar tracts emerge from the superior and inferior colliculi on both sides, terminating in the intermediate vermis (culmen, declive, folium, tuber, pyramid) and the lobulus simplex. The function of the tectocerebellar tract is not known, but it is widely believed to mediate visual and auditory reflexes.

References

Cerebellar connections